is a Japanese manga artist. He is well known for his manga Go-toubun no Hanayome, which was serialized in Kodansha's Weekly Shōnen Magazine from August 2017 to February 2020. In May 2019, he won the award for Best Shōnen Manga at the 43rd annual Kodansha Manga Awards, alongside Ōima Yoshitoki's To Your Eternity. It was the 5th best selling manga in Japan in 2019.

According to Haruba, his pen name "Haruba Negi" comes from the protagonist of Negima! Magister Negi Magi, Negi Springfield. On the award ceremony of the 43rd annual Kodansha Manga Awards, Haruba said it was "special to him" to be selected by Akamatsu Ken, who was one of the judges of the award and the creator of Negima! Magister Negi Magi.

Works

Serials
  (Story: Shun Hirose, Weekly Shōnen Magazine, 2014–2015)
  (Weekly Shōnen Magazine, 2017–2020)
  (Weekly Shōnen Magazine, 2021–ongoing)

One-shots
 Coward-Cross-World (Magazine SPECIAL 2013 Issue 4)
 Ura Sekai Communication (Monthly Comic Dengeki Daioh, September, 2014)
 Vampire Killer (Weekly Shōnen Magazine, 2016 Merger Issue 2 and 3)
 Go-Tōbun no Hanayome (Weekly Shōnen Magazine, 2017 Issue 8)

Notes

References

External links
 

Living people
1991 births
Manga artists from Aichi Prefecture
Pseudonymous artists